Mary Jayne Gold (1909 – October 5, 1997) was an American heiress who played an important role helping European Jews and intellectuals escape Nazi Germany in 1940-1941, during World War II.

Early years and education

Born in Chicago, Illinois into a family of considerable wealth, Gold was educated at the Master's School at Dobbs Ferry, New York and a finishing school in Italy. In the 1930s, her money allowed her to enjoy the vibrant social scene in London and Paris. Piloting her own airplane, she traveled around Europe, spending her time at luxury hotels, skiing at the best resorts in the Alps, and socializing with the elite of the day.

During World War II

Gold was living in a Paris apartment when France fell to the onslaught of the German army in 1940. She fled to the Mediterranean seaport of Marseille which, although not Nazi occupied, was under the control of the collaborationist Vichy regime. In Marseille she met Miriam Davenport, an American art student, and Varian Fry, an American journalist and intellectual. Fry had $3,000 and a short list of refugees under imminent threat of arrest by agents of the Gestapo, mostly Jews. Clamoring at his door came anti-Nazi writers, avant-garde artists, musicians and hundreds of others desperately seeking any chance to escape France. In the armistice agreement between Germany and defeated France, France had agreed to "surrender on demand" refugees to the Nazis.

Instead of returning to the United States, Gold chose to remain and joined Davenport and Fry along with other volunteers in sheltering refugees and organizing their escape through the mountains to Spain or by smuggling them aboard freighters sailing to either North Africa or ports in North or South America. She was helped in part by returning French Foreign Legionnaire turned local gangster Raymond Couraud, who became her lover.

Gold helped subsidize the operation which is credited with participating in the rescue of some 2,000 refugees, Among the escapees were notables such as the sculptor Jacques Lipchitz, artist Marc Chagall, writer Hannah Arendt and Nobel Prize winner, physician and biochemist Otto Meyerhof.

In fall 1941, Gold returned to the United States, while Couraud traveled to Spain and onwards to England, where he became a war hero in the Special Air Service.

After the war

After the war, she divided her time between her apartment in New York City and a house she had built in the village of Gassin, Var, not far from Saint-Tropez. In 1980, she wrote about her wartime experiences in the memoir Crossroads Marseilles 1940, published by Doubleday in 1980, and translated into French in 2001 by Alice Seelow. Mary Jayne Gold's literary estate was left to Pierre Sauvage.

Gold never married and had no children. She died of pancreatic cancer in 1997 at her villa in Gassin.

Her great-nephew's mother, Alison Leslie Gold, is a well-known author of books on the Holocaust, notably, Anne Frank Remembered: The Story of the Woman Who Helped Hide the Frank Family (1987), which was co-written with Miep Gies.

Published work
Crossroads Marseilles, 1940 (1980)

References

Further reading
 Peggy Guggenheim, Out of This Century, Confessions of an Art Addict, (Foreword by Gore Vidal, (Introduction by Alfred H. Barr Jr.), ANCHOR BOOKS, Doubleday & Company, Inc. Universe Books 1979,

External links
Obituary in the New York Times
Varian Fry Institute: Mary Jayne Gold
Oral history interview with Mary Jayne Gold

1909 births
1997 deaths
People from Chicago
American humanitarians
Women humanitarians
American expatriates in France
American women civilians in World War II
Deaths from pancreatic cancer
Deaths from cancer in France
People from Dobbs Ferry, New York
20th-century American women writers
The Masters School people